The Fall of Troy is the debut studio album by The Fall of Troy, released on November 4, 2003. It was released by Lujo Records and Equal Vision Records on the re-release. It was recorded at The Hall of Justice in Seattle.

Track listing

Information
The whole album was recorded in one week throughout one take.

Lead singer and guitarist Thomas Erak has the original album's cover art tattooed on his left arm.

"The Last March of The Ents" is about the Destruction of Isengard from J.R.R. Tolkien's ''The Lord of the Rings.
"The Adventures of Allan Gordon" is about the book The Iceberg Hermit.

Fans have speculated about the meaning of "F.C.P.S.I.T.S.G.E.P.G.E.P.G.E.P.". According to the band's FAQ, "No comment, and even if you figure it out, it doesn't mean anything." (Presumably, the title is a joke that does not mean anything related to the lyrics or the song's meaning itself.).

Personnel 
 Tim Ward - bass, vocals
 Thomas Erak - guitar, vocals
 Andrew Forsman - drums
 Joel M. Brown - production, additional vocals on "F.C.P.S.I.T.S.G.E.P.G.E.P.G.E.P."
 Jeff Suffering - vocals on "Spartacus" and "F.C.P.S.I.T.S.G.E.P.G.E.P.G.E.P."
 Gail Erak - vocals on "What Sound Does a Mastodon Make" and backing vocals on "F.C.P.S.I.T.S.G.E.P.G.E.P.G.E.P."
 Andy Myers - design and layout

References

2003 debut albums
The Fall of Troy albums
Equal Vision Records albums